The Laboring People's Party of Korea was a Centre-left political party in South Korea and North Korea.

Under the leadership of Lee Yong, the party continued to operate in North Korea where it participated in elections. It won seats in the Supreme People's Assembly at least in 1957. Two of its delegates were purged in the aftermath of the August Faction Incident sometime between 1957 and 1959. Among those purged was Lee Yong.

See also 
 Democratic Independent Party
 Hong Myong-hui

References

Defunct political parties in South Korea
Labour parties
Left-wing parties in South Korea
Political parties disestablished in 1949
Political parties established in 1947
Progressive parties in South Korea
1947 establishments in South Korea
1949 disestablishments in South Korea